The église Sainte-Madeleine is a neoclassical 18th century hall church in the Battant district of Besançon, France, dedicated to Saint Mary Magdalene. Antoine-Pierre II de Grammont, the archbishop of Besançon, had it built from 1746 to 1766 to plans by the architect Nicolas Nicole.

Roman Catholic churches completed in 1766
18th-century Roman Catholic church buildings in France
Churches in Doubs
Buildings and structures in Besançon
Neoclassical church buildings in France